WTZ may refer to:

 William T. Zenor (1846–1916), United States Representative from Indiana
 Western Tlacolula Zapotec